Adriana Ferreyr (born 18 May 1983) is a Brazilian film, television, stage actress and entrepreneur.

Early life and education
Ferreyr was born in Salvador, Bahia, Brazil, the daughter of Rogério Ferreiro, a civil engineer.

Her acting career started in the theater at the age of eight when she joined the theater company of Fernando Peltier. She acted in several plays, among which: O Jardim das Borboletas (The Butterfly Garden), O Jardim das Abelhas (The Bees Garden), Turma da Mônica (Monica and her pals) and The Sound of Music (A Noviça Rebelde).

While taking classes at the Pontifical Catholic University of Rio de Janeiro, Ferreyr continued to pursue an acting career and, after two years, landed a role as a lead character in the prime time Sistema Brasileiro de Televisão soap opera Marisol (2002), playing Vanessa Lima do Vale, Marisol's adopted daughter.

In 2011, Ferreyr was pursuing a bachelor's degree at Columbia University School of General Studies.

Personal life
Ferreyr previously dated George Soros for 5 years. On August 10, 2011, Ferreyr filed a $50 million lawsuit against Soros for fraud, harassment, emotional distress, estoppel and assault and battery. In 2011 Soros tried to dismiss the lawsuit and was unsuccessful. In March 2013, Soros sued Ferreyr for defamation and assault.
On April 1, 2014, Soros won a partial dismissal of Ferreyr's lawsuit; the appellate court, in a unanimous decision, dismissed her claims of fraud, infliction of emotional distress and other claims against Soros. The appellate court didn't dismiss Ferreyr's claim of assault and battery, however.

As of December 2012, Ferreyr lives in the Harlem neighborhood of New York City.

Career
In 2011, Ferreyr owned a retail business selling sunglasses and Christmas ornaments through kiosks in malls on the West Coast of the United States.

Filmography

References

External links

Living people
1983 births
People from Salvador, Bahia
Brazilian child actresses
People from Harlem
Columbia University School of General Studies alumni
Brazilian musical theatre actresses
Brazilian television actresses
Pontifical Catholic University of Rio de Janeiro alumni